"Indomitable" is a fantasy short story by Terry Brooks in his Shannara series, and takes place two years after the events in The Wishsong of Shannara. It was first published in the 2003 collection Legends II.

Plot summary
Two years after the events chronicled in The Wishsong of Shannara, Kimber Boh finds Jair Ohmsford working in his parents' inn while they are away. She tells him of a dream that has been haunting Cogline where the shade of the fallen Druid Allanon comes to him and tells him that a page from the Ildatch was not destroyed, and that Jair must destroy it. Jair is unconvinced, but agrees to travel to Hearthstone with Kimber and meet with Cogline. The first night Jair is there the shade of Allanon visits him and tells him that he must travel to the lair of the Mwellrets, Dun Fee Aran, and destroy the remaining page of the Ildatch before its power grows. The three companions journey to Dun Fee Aran, and along the way encounter a peddler who warns them against going there. Jair struggles with his own fears of going back to that evil place where he was once imprisoned by the lizard-like Mwellrets, with their hypnotizing eyes.

Once they arrive, Jair slips medication into Cogline and Kimber Boh's ale, which causes them to fall into a deep sleep, so that he may enter the fortress alone, and spare them harm. Jair uses his Wishsong to disguise himself and gain entry to the fortress. He conjures up an illusion of Allanon which sends the Mwellrets into a panic, then follows one to the chamber where the remaining Ildatch page is guarded. He then tries to pick up the page, but it burns him and he howls, giving away his presence. The Mwellrets begin searching for him, but cannot find him as he is hidden by the Wishsong. They get close to him, and he conjures up an illusion of warriors, but the Mwellrets quickly see through that and in a panic he conjures up an illusion of the Weapons Master, Garet Jax, which he inhabits. This endows him with Garet Jax's fighting abilities, allowing him to slaughter the Mwellrets and destroy the Ildatch page. He then returns to himself and escapes the fortress, realizing that his Wishsong is much more powerful than he had realized. He can not only conjure up illusions, but he can inhabit those illusions, along with their powers.

Characters
Jair Ohmsford is the son of Wil Ohmsford and born with the magic of the wishsong.
Kimber Boh is the adopted daughter of Cogline.
Cogline is an old man who was once part of the Druid order.

Other characters mentioned
Allanon is a Druid shade killed in The Wishsong of Shannara. 
Brin Ohmsford, is the daughter of Wil Ohmsford and born with the magic of the wishsong.
Garet Jax is a renowned Weapons Master and skilled in every weapon known to man; killed in The Wishsong of Shannara.
Slanter is a gnome.
Whisper is a moor cat.

External links
 

Shannara novels
2003 short stories
High fantasy novels